Geir Hafredahl (born 23 May 1962) is a Norwegian politician for the Labour Party.

He served as a deputy representative to the Norwegian Parliament from Telemark during the term 1989–1993. During the period he served 22 days as a representative in  the parliament.

References

1962 births
Living people
Deputy members of the Storting
Labour Party (Norway) politicians
Politicians from Telemark
Place of birth missing (living people)
20th-century Norwegian politicians